Boutet is a French surname. Notable people with the surname include:

Jacques Marie Boutet (1745–1812), French actor and dramatist
Nicolas Noel Boutet (1761-1833), French gun and edged weapons manufacturer. Gunmaker to King Louis XVI and Napoleon.
Henri Boutet (1851–1919), French artist

French-language surnames